HC Villars is an ice hockey team in Villars-sur-Ollon, Switzerland. They play in the Swiss 1. Liga.

The club was founded in 1908 as one of the founders of the Nationalliga A. They played in the Nationalliga A in the 1960s. Villars won the league title in 1963 and 1964.

Achievements
NLA champion: (2) 1963, 1964
NLB champion: (2) 1962, 1974
Swiss 1. Liga champion (3) 1961, 1969, 1983

References

Ice hockey teams in Switzerland
Ice hockey clubs established in 1908
1908 establishments in Switzerland